Khortytsia is a large island on the Dnieper River in Ukraine.

Khortytsia may also refer to:

Khortytsia, Zaporizhzhia Raion, a village in Zaporizhzhia Oblast
Khortytsia Raion, a district of the city of Zaporizhzhia
Khortytsia (company), a Ukrainian company that produces alcoholic beverages, in particular [horilka]s
Chortitza Colony, a Russian Mennonite community located at Khortytsia Island

See also
Mennonite settlements in Canada:
Chortitz, Manitoba, in the Rural Municipality of Stanley
Randolph, Manitoba, formerly known as Chortitz, in the Rural Municipality of Hanover
Chortitz, Saskatchewan, in Rural Municipality of Coulee No. 136
Chortitzer Mennonite Conference, a group of Mennonite churches in western Canada
Chortitz Heritage Church